The 4th National Congress of the Chinese Communist Party was held in the Shanghai International Settlement at a shikumen residence in  No. 8, Lane 256, Dongbaoxing Road, between 11 and 22 January 1925. The congress was attended by 20 participants representing 994 party members of the Chinese Communist Party (CCP). The congress succeeded the 3rd National Congress of the Chinese Communist Party and preceded the 5th National Congress of the Chinese Communist Party. A congress report was drafted by Chen Duxiu who represented the 3rd Central Executive Committee of the Chinese Communist Party.

Background 

Upon the formation of the First United Front between the Chinese Communist Party (CCP) in 1924, labour and peasant movements intensified throughout China, generating fears of revolution. Amidst rising tensions, the congress aimed to: 

 reflect the experiences gathered under the CCPKMT cooperation throughout 1924;
 strengthen the leadership of revolutionary movements, and to;
 respond several new issues faced by the party.

Agenda 
Congress was attended by several important figures within the Comintern and the CCP. This included Chen Duxiu, Cai Hesen, Qu Qiubai, Tan Pingshan, Zhou Enlai, Peng Shuzhi, Zhang Tailei, Chen Tanqiu, Li Weihan, Li Lisan, Wang Hebo, Xiang Ying, and Grigori Voitinsky.  

Congress noted: "A classless society, in the event of a people's revolution, must oppose both left and right-leaning thoughts." Congress also pointed that right-wing politics is the main ideological threat of the CCP. It was determined that the CCP must achieve a "completely democratic political platform within and out of the Kuomintang while maintaining the independence of the CCP.", and using propaganda to expand left-leaning factions of the party, attaining support from the moderates while opposing right-wing politics. The party was also directed by the congress to assist in Kuomintang's political movements. 

12 resolutions were passed in congress. 14 members were elected during the process for the newly formed 4th Central Committee of the Chinese Communist Party. After congress, the first meeting of the 4th Central Committee was held, electing 5 party members, namely Chen Duxiu (as the general secretary), Peng Shuzhi, Zhang Guotao, Cai Hesen and Qu Qiubai to form the party's Central Bureau (a precursor to the Politburo). 

Congress simultaneously made revisions to the party constitution. During the 2nd National Congress of the Chinese Communist Party, it was decided that party organizations of the lowest-tier were to be referred as "committees" composed of 3 to 5 party members. By the 3rd Congress, it was changed to "small groups" of 5 to 10 party members. However, revisions of the 4th Congress renamed them " to "branches", while dictating that a "branch" could be formed with the participation of 3 or more party members.

Aftermath and legacy 
The original shikumen residence in Shanghai that hosted the congress was destroyed during the Second Sino-Japanese War. The site has since been converted into several apartments constructed during the 1980s. In 1995, the Shanghai Municipality created a memorial at the site to commemorate the 70th anniversary of the 4th congress.

The congress was the first time the CCP had directly addressed two political issues. The first issue relates to leadership concerns in the event of a revolution. The Resolution About Revolutionary Movements, drafted during congress, stated, "A political party pursuing a classless society should lead the movement to achieve one, not by any means of affiliation with capitalists; Instead it should be participated by their own will, free from social classes with a clear objective." It also mentioned that "a classless society is the most revolutionary society; In a democratic revolution, it must have participation from the most revolutionary classless society with the ability to oversight and lead it, in order to secure a total victory."

The question of an alliance between the peasants and the workers in the event of a revolution was also addressed. In the Resolution Of Peasant Movements, it was clarified that the peasantry "is the basis of the force to launch a classless revolution". The resolution also emphasized the importance of the peasantry's role in a revolution, stating, "If a classless society and its constituent political parties fail to incite revolution among the peasantry, then the position of the classless society and the success of a Chinese revolution would be impossible to attain." 

Congress also firmly established the CCP's stance against warlordism and conservative economics systems.

References 

1925 conferences
1925 in China
National Congress of the Chinese Communist Party